NAACP Legal Defense & Educational Fund, Inc. v. Trump, No. 1:17-cv-05427-ALC (S.D.N.Y. 2017), was a lawsuit filed in the United States District Court for the Southern District of New York.  The plaintiffs, the NAACP Legal Defense Fund, The Ordinary People Society, and a coalition of civil rights groups alleged that the defendants, President Donald Trump, the Vice President Michael Pence, and Kris Kobach were in violation of the Fifth and Fifteenth Amendments and the Federal Advisory Committee Act by establishing the Presidential Advisory Commission on Election Integrity (PEIC) for the purpose of intentionally discriminating against Black and Latino voters in violation of the Fifth and Fifteenth Amendments to the Constitution and the Federal Advisory Committee Act.

Background 
Kris Kobach was the Secretary of State of Kansas from 2011 to 2019. On November 20, 2016, President Trump asked Kobach to co-chair a commission to investigate possible voting irregularities in the 2016 presidential election. Kobach was a defendant in parallel lawsuits filed by the Electronic Privacy Information Center and the ACLU.

On June 28, 2017, the Commission requested voter records from each of the states and the District of Columbia.  Forty-four states rejected the request to deliver voter records 
On July 10, 2017, the Commission postponed its request of the states.

The United States Department of Justice represented Trump.

According to the text of the complaint, the suit asked for a permanent injunction halting the operation of the Presidential Advisory Commission on Election Integrity.

Specific allegations
 The President has neither constitutional nor statutory authority to create a new executive organ for the purpose of launching an investigation that targets individual or groups of voters. 
 President Trump has not appointed a commission for the purpose of consulting with fair-and-balanced advisors; rather, he has appointed a commission stacked with biased members to undertake an investigation into unfounded allegations of voter fraud, even though Congress has specifically delegated the authority to ensure the accuracy of voter rolls to the Election Assistance Commission and state election officials, not the President. 
 Violations of the Fifth and Fifteenth Amendments and Unauthorized Presidential Action

Procedural history 

A second amended complaint was filed on October 20, 2017. The government moved to dismiss the case in November 2017. After the government disbanded the commission on January 3, 2018, the case was dismissed on February 28, 2018 at the NAACP Legal Defense Fund's request.

See also

 List of lawsuits involving Donald Trump
 ACLU v. Trump and Pence
 Federal Advisory Committee Act
 Presidential Advisory Commission on Election Integrity

References

Donald Trump litigation
United States District Court for the Southern District of New York cases